Arunachala(m) may refer to:

 Arunachalam (name), a Tamil name (including a list of persons with the name)
 Arunachalam (film), a 1997 Tamil drama directed by Sundar C
 Arunachala, a holy hill in Tamil Nadu, India
 28833 Arunachalam, a minor planet discovered in 2000
 Arunachala Kavi (1711–1779), 18th-century Tamil poet

See also 
 Arunachal Pradesh, a state in northeastern India